The Kamikita Expressway (上北自動車道 Kamikita Jidōshyadō) is a free two-lane expressway in Aomori Prefecture connecting the towns of Shichinohe and Rokunohe. Alongside other tolled roads, the expressway is part of a series of highways that will link the Hachinohe Expressway to the Aomori Expressway. The road is managed by the Ministry of Land, Infrastructure and Transport and is numbered E4A as an extension of the Tōhoku Expressway. It is routed concurrently with an alternate route of Japan National Route 45.

Route description

The Kamikita Expressway will be made up of three sections upon completion. The easternmost section, named Kamikita Road, begins at the Kamikita Expressway's eastern terminus. This terminus lies at Rokunohe Junction, where the free expressway has a junction with the Daini-Michinoku Toll Road, a road tolled by the Aomori Prefecture Road Corporation. From this intersection, the expressway follows a northwestern heading through Rokunohe into the town, Tōhoku. In Tōhoku, the expressway meets Aomori Prefecture Route 211 at its former western terminus, Kamikita Interchange. West of this interchange lies the Kamikita-Tenmabayashi Road, a section of road that extends the route  to its current western terminus with National Route 394. Beyond Route 394, the expressway is known as the Tenmabayashi Road, a  section that is currently under construction. This section, once completed, will run to the expressway's future western terminus at National Route 4.

The speed limit is 70 km/h for the entire route; however, during the winter the speed limit is reduced to 60 km/h.

In 2015, the daily average of vehicles that traveled along the Kamikita Road section of the expressway was 3,884 between Rokunohe and Rokunohe-Misawa Interchange and 4,694 between Rokunohe-Misawa Interchange and Kamikita Interchange.

History 

The Kamikita Expressway was designated in 1987 as part of a single expressway running from the capital city of Aomori Prefecture, Aomori to the prefecture's second largest city, Hachinohe. The first section of the expressway opened in 2013, two years ahead of schedule. This section connects the Daini-Michinoku Toll Road to Aomori Prefecture Route 211.
On 27 November 2018, National Route 394 was rerouted as part of the expressway project to improve access at the junction between it and the expressway.
On 8 February 2019, the interchanges that were set to open later that year were renamed from Kamikita 2 Interchange and Tenmabayashi 1 to Tōhoku Interchange and Shichinohe Interchange, respectively. The section between Route 211 and National Route 394 was opened on 16 March 2019 at 4:00 p.m. JST after festivities and a tape cutting ceremony.

Future
Currently, the expressway is under construction between National Route 394 and National Route 4, the goal date for completion of this project is 2022. The expressway is ultimately planned to connect to the Shimokita Expressway and the Michinoku Toll Road.

Junction list
The entire expressway is in Aomori Prefecture.

See also

References

External links

Ministry of Land, Infrastructure and Transport: Tohoku Regional Development Bureau  

Roads in Aomori Prefecture
Expressways in Japan
Tōhoku Expressway
Proposed roads in Japan
2013 establishments in Japan